Gretchen Keppel-Aleks is an American scientist and assistant professor at the University of Michigan in the College of Engineering's department of Climate and Space Sciences and Engineering. She primarily focuses on Earth's climate and the effects of greenhouse gasses on Earth's atmosphere.

Career and research

Career history 
Keppel-Aleks began her academic career working as a research assistant during both her undergraduate and graduate and studies (at Massachusetts Institute of Technology and later California Institute of Technology). Currently, Keppel-Aleks works as a research assistant at the University of Michigan. She works in the department of Climate and Space Sciences and Engineering (2013–Present).

Under the supervision of Paul O. Wennberg, Keppel-Aleks completed her dissertation (Ph.D.) in 2012. Her thesis, titled "Constraints on the global carbon budget from variations in total column carbon dioxide", examines the importance of evaluating patterns of CO2 when predicting models of global climate change.

Research 
Keppel-Aleks fields of interests are: the carbon cycle and climate interactions, the remote sensing of atmospheric gasses and vegetation properties, Earth System modeling, and atmospheric tracer transport.

Keppel-Aleks has made many notable research contributions, especially surrounding greenhouse gas emissions and global climate change. She led several research projects, such as a project titled "Developing a Mechanistic Understanding of Variability in the Atmospheric CO2 Growth Rate Owing to Interannual Climate Oscillations", in which scientists explored how Earth systems react to a changing climate. She has also participates in NASA's OCO-2 research team, in which she and 20 other scientists work to investigate how human populations interact with, and contribute to the presence of CO2 in Earth's atmosphere.

Awards and honors

Academic awards 
Keppel-Aleks has won many awards during her scientific career. In 2019, she won AGU's Global Environmental Change Early Career Award for her contributions in global environmental change. She has also received a research highlight from the Department of Energy for her leading research on the use of the Community Earth System Model (CESM) in determining the future of global climate change with regards to rising levels of CO2. She has also been awarded several fellowships, such as the NOAA Climate and Global Change Postdoctoral Fellowship, as well as the American Association of University Women dissertation fellowship. Additionally, Keppel-Aleks has been awarded the Kavli Fellowship. As a Kavli fellow, Keppel-Aleks presented on the importance of terrestrial and aquatic cycle monitoring in the monitoring of CO2.

Grants 
Currently, Keppel-Aleks is being funded for 11 individual projects, one of which, titled "Developing a Mechanistic Understanding of Variability in the Atmospheric  Growth Rate Owing to Interannual Climate Oscillations ", is a project worth over $1 million funded through NASA and the University of Michigan. Other grants and fellowships awarded to Keppel-Aleks include NASA's Earth and Space Science Fellowship and in the past, Keppel-Aleks received research grants such as one from Keck Institute for Space Studies, in which Keppel-Aleks examined patterns of photosynthesis and solar-induced fluorescence emitted from photosynthetic organisms.

References 

Living people
University of Michigan faculty
California Institute of Technology alumni
American women scientists
American climatologists
Women climatologists
Year of birth missing (living people)
American women academics
21st-century American women